is a life simulation game for the Nintendo 64 where the player must raise and look after hamsters. It was released only in Japan in 2001.

Fictional hamsters
Nintendo 64 games
Nintendo 64-only games
2001 video games
Japan-exclusive video games
Video games developed in Japan
Single-player video games